The Town That Forgot God is a 1922 American drama film directed by Harry F. Millarde and written by Paul Sloane. The film stars Ben Grauer, Warren William, Jane Thomas, Harry Benham, Edwin Denison and Grace Barton. The film was released on February 11, 1923, by Fox Film Corporation.

Cast             
Ben Grauer as David
Warren William as Eben 
Jane Thomas as Betty Gibbs
Harry Benham as Harry Adams
Edwin Denison as The Squire 
Grace Barton as His Wife
Raymond Bloomer as David
Nina Cassavant as David's Wife

References

External links
 

1922 films
1920s English-language films
Silent American drama films
1922 drama films
Fox Film films
American silent feature films
American black-and-white films
Films directed by Harry F. Millarde
1920s American films